Ilya Tufanovich Sadygov (born 29 September 2000) is a Russian football player of Azerbaijani descent. He plays as a striker or left winger for FC Khimki.

Club career
On 24 June 2021, he signed with Russian Premier League club FC Khimki. He made his debut in the RPL for Khimki on 16 August 2021 in a game against PFC Sochi, he substituted Senin Sebai in added time.

Career statistics

References

External links
 
 
 

2000 births
People from Khimki
Sportspeople from Moscow Oblast
Russian sportspeople of Azerbaijani descent
Living people
Russian footballers
Association football forwards
FC Olimp-Dolgoprudny players
FC Khimki players
Russian Second League players
Russian Premier League players